James Sanford may refer to:

James Sanford (athlete) (born 1957), American track and field sprinter
James Sanford (ice hockey) (born 1984), Canadian professional ice hockey defenceman 
James Terry Sanford (1917–1998), United States Senator from North Carolina

See also
James Sandford (disambiguation)